Jeffrey E. Smith (born March 15, 1955) is an American politician and member of the Wisconsin State Senate. A member of the Democratic Party of Wisconsin, he represents District 31, which stretches from Eau Claire to Prescott to Black River Falls.

Early life 
Smith graduated from North High School in Eau Claire in 1973 and then took up his father's window-cleaning company, which he ran until he sold it in 2011.

Political career
Smith served on the town board for the Town of Brunswick and was chair of the board. He founded the Parent Advisory Committee for the Eau Claire School District. Because of that work, he was appointed by Governor Jim Doyle to serve on the Task Force on Educational Excellence in 2003. Smith also served as the co-chair of the Eau Claire County Democratic Party. He is a member of the Eau Claire Area Chamber of Commerce and Wisconsin League of Conservation Voters.

Smith was elected to the Wisconsin State Assembly in 2006, unseating the Republican incumbent Robin Kreibich. He was the chair of the Elections and Campaign Reform Committee and a member of five other committees: Colleges and Universities, Financial Institutions, Education, Renewable Energy and Rural Affairs, and Public Safety.

Smith sponsored Assembly Bill 119, which established five-year-old Kindergarten as a prerequisite to first grade in public and charter schools; Assembly Bill 250, which created licensing requirements for dog sellers and animal shelters, and Assembly Bill 276, which divided the UW System Board of Regents into seven geographical districts.

Based on lifetime voting records on gun issues and the results of a questionnaire sent to all Congressional candidates in 2008, the National Rifle Association Political Victory Fund assigned Smith a grade of C (with grades ranging from a high of A+ to a low of F). Based on a point system, with points assigned for actions in support of or in opposition to the AFL-CIO, Smith received a rating of 100. NARAL Pro-Choice Wisconsin gave Smith a rating of one-hundred percent on abortion-related issues. In 2010, Smith earned a 100% rating from the Wisconsin League of Conservation voters.

In February 2010, Smith received a Humane State Legislator award from The Humane Society of the United States, which recognized him for his efforts to pass The Dog Breeders Licensure Bill, which regulates large-scale puppy breeding operations, commonly referred to as "puppy mills."

Democratic party chair candidacy 
In 2015, Smith was a candidate for chair of the Democratic Party of Wisconsin (DPW), facing Jason Rae, Martha Laning, Joe Wineke, and Stephen Smith. If elected DPW Chair, Smith said he’d make it a priority to engage county parties and empower them to be more proactive.

During the campaign, Smith's campaign penned a letter that criticized Laning for her lack of experience and offered her the post of DPW Executive Director if Smith were to be elected chair. Laning publicly stated that she had refused Smith’s offer and criticized Smith for mentioning the offer in campaign literature. Shortly after the letter controversy, Smith wrote an open letter dropping out of the race and asking his supporters to support Laning.

Electoral history

Wisconsin Assembly (2006–2014)

Wisconsin Senate (2018)

| colspan="6" style="text-align:center;background-color: #e9e9e9;"| Democratic Primary, August 14, 2018

| colspan="6" style="text-align:center;background-color: #e9e9e9;"| General Election, November 6, 2018

References

External links
 Profile at the Wisconsin Senate
 Campaign website
 
 Follow the Money - Jeff Smith
2008 2006 2004 campaign contributions
Campaign 2008 campaign contributions at Wisconsin Democracy Campaign
 "Wisconsin State Assembly Election", 2012

1955 births
Living people
Democratic Party members of the Wisconsin State Assembly
Democratic Party Wisconsin state senators
Politicians from Eau Claire, Wisconsin
21st-century American politicians
Businesspeople from Wisconsin